Butler School may refer to schools in the United States:

 Mary Butler School, a K-8 school in Long Beach, California
 Butler School (Oak Brook, Illinois), listed on the NRHP in Illinois
 Butler School (Lowell, Massachusetts), listed on the NRHP in Massachusetts

See also
 Butler Elementary School (disambiguation)
 Butler Middle School
 Butler High School (disambiguation)
 Butler School, Maryland
 Butler Area School District, Pennsylvania
 South Butler County School District, Pennsylvania